Built in 1844 by Cottam and Hallen of Cornwall Road, Lambeth; in their works within sight of Waterloo Bridge Erected by the Royal Engineers, the Gibb's Hill Lighthouse is the taller of two lighthouses on Bermuda, and one of the first lighthouses in the world to be made of cast-iron. This is because at that time, steel still was not able to be bent. The optic consists of a Fresnel lens from 1904 revolving on steel bearings. However, for most of its history, the lens revolved on a bed of 1,200 pounds of mercury. While it is certainly not extremely tall in lighthouse standards, the hill that it stands on is one of the highest on the island.

The lighthouse has 185 steps to the top in eight flights. Until 1964, most of the light was run by hand, but in June of that year, the whole system was automated and runs on electricity. Sixty-thousand people ascended the lighthouse in 1985, and it continues to be a popular tourist attraction.

A radar antenna for marine shipping was installed atop the lighthouse in 1987 supported on a steel space frame fixed at the original bolt locations. The radar and supporting frame were undamaged in September 2003 despite the oscillation of the tower during Hurricane Fabian. This movement caused two gallons of mercury to slop out of the lens support trough and put the light out of operation. The 1904 lens was repaired in 2004 with steel bearings to replace the mercury.

At the base of the tower is the Lighthouse Tea Room, a restaurant converted from the lighthouse keeper's former living quarters, where breakfast, lunch, and dinner are served daily.

See also
 List of lighthouses in Bermuda

Sources

References

External links

 Department of Marine & Ports Services

Lighthouses completed in 1844
Lighthouses in Bermuda
Southampton Parish, Bermuda